Rhinomyzini is a tribe of horse flies in the family Tabanidae.

Genera
Alocella Quentin, 1990
Betrequia Oldroyd, 1970
Gastroxides Saunders, 1842
Jashinea Oldroyd, 1970
Mackerrasia Dias, 1956
Oldroydiella Dias, 1955
Orgizocella Quentin, 1990
Orgizomyia Grünberg, 1906
Rhinomyza Wiedemann, 1820
Seguytabanus Paulian, 1962
Sphecodemyia Austen, 1937
Tabanocella Bigot, 1856
Thaumastocera Grünberg, 1906
Thriambeutes Grünberg, 1906

References

Tabanidae
Brachycera tribes
Taxa named by Günther Enderlein